JFR can mean:
 J. Front Retailing, a Japanese company
 JDK Flight Recorder, Java diagnostic software
 Johann's Face Records, Chicago, US
 John Faulkner Racing, a former motor racing team in Australia
 Paamiut Airport (IATA airport code), in Paamiut, Greenland
 Journal of Formalized Reasoning in mathematics

Jason is a student in JFR, he is one of the best actor in JFR history